Thura Shwe Mann (born 11 July 1947) is a Burmese politician who was Speaker of the Pyithu Hluttaw, the lower house of parliament from 31 January 2011 to 29 January 2016. He is a former general and, whilst being a protégé of senior general Than Shwe, was considered the third most powerful man in the State Peace and Development Council (SPDC), which ruled Myanmar until 2011.

He was elected to Parliament in the 2010 general election. He was later selected as Speaker of the Lower House at the first regular session of the Pyithu Hluttaw in 2011. He has been crucial in the newly-found activism of the Lower House vis-à-vis the Upper House and the executive.

In May 2013, he replaced President Thein Sein as head of the ruling Union Solidarity and Development Party (USDP). That same year, he confirmed he would run for president in 2015. Amidst reports of tensions between himself and Thein Sein, he was removed from his post as head of the USDP in August 2015. Finally he was sacked from USDP together with other 17 senior members in April 2016. He is currently the Supreme Leader & Chairman of Union Betterment Party (UBP). He is the founder and it's been announced 200,000 members of his newly formed political party as of 2019. To transform Burma into a developed nation and superpower among ASEAN by 2030 is the ultimate purpose or target of General Thura Shwe Mannn and UBP.

Military career
Shwe Mann graduated from the Defence Services Academy, Intake 11, Pyin Oo Lwin in 1969. He quickly rose through the ranks, and became major in 1986.

He served as a Regiment Commander in Karen State and earned the honorific title Thura (brave hero) for his military campaign against the Karen National Liberation Army in 1988. The campaign led to the eventual capture of the Karen National Union (KNU)’s headquarters in the Methawaw Area. He served as a tactical operations commander for Light Infantry Division (LID) 66 based in Prome from 1993 to 1995. His achievements in the Karen state in 1994 meant that he was promoted to the rank of brigadier general. He was commander of the elite LID 11 based in Inn Daing, near Yangon in 1996. In November 1997, he was promoted to the rank of major general and became a permanent member of the State Peace and Development Council (SPDC). That same year, he became commander of South-west Command in Pathein, Ayeyarwady Division. He concurrently served as the Chairman of the Ayeyarwady Peace and Development Council.

In line with the SPDC’s developmental rhetoric, he supported a number of initiatives aimed at increasing agricultural productivity and food security. These included supporting seasonal crop rotation, and converting more than 1 million acres of low, dry and wetlands into cultivated land. This was possible thanks to improvements in water channelisation and river banks. 500,000 acres of intensive and extensive fishery farms were also created. He was promoted to Joint Chief of Staff of the Army, Navy, and Air Force in 2001. That same year, he was promoted to the rank of lieutenant general. He became Chief of General Staff of the Armed Services in 2003. As a key figure in the SPDC, he seems to have overseen a number of offensives against ethnic insurgents. This claim has been raised specifically in relation to the 2006 offensive against the Karen National Liberation Army (KNLA).<ref name="auto5">"Shwe Mann “Behind Karen Offensive"", The Irrawaddy", 3 May 2006. Retrieved 30 May 2015.</ref>

In September 2010, he retired from the army. Following his retirement, Shwe Mann became a candidate for the newly created Union Solidarity and Development Party (USDP). He was selected as a representative for Zay Yar Thiri constituency in the 2010 general election.

Relationship with Than Shwe
Shwe Mann has had a close relationship to former dictator General Than Shwe. When Than Shwe became commander-in-chief of the Tatmadaw in 1992, he made Shwe Mann one of his deputies. Although Than Shwe frequently shook up the ranks, firing ministers and military officials, Shwe Mann was allowed to rise through the ranks and become the third most powerful figure in the country.

A 2007 U.S. State Department cable called him “The Senior general’s Right-Hand Man.” The cable continues: “[…] when Than Shwe wants something done, … Shwe Mann usually conveys his orders to the army and enforces his will.”

It has been alleged that Than Shwe feared Shwe Mann’s comeuppance, and decided to balance his aspirations and power by choosing Thein Sein for the position of President and Tin Aung Myint Oo as Vice-President.

Relationship with other senior officials
Shwe Mann played a key role in the ousting of Prime Minister Khin Nyunt in 2004. After Khin Nyunt’s arrest, Shwe Mann famously said that “Nobody is above the law.”

He was seen as the most likely successor to General Maung Aye, who was Deputy Commander-in-Chief of the Armed Forces. Allegedly, Shwe Mann and Maung Aye were political rivals.

Shwe Mann was also an alleged rival to first Vice-President Tin Aung Myint Oo.

It is believed that he has the loyalty of General Min Aung Hlaing, the commander-in-chief of the Armed Forces.

Allegations of human rights abuses
A leaked U.S. cable stated that “[l]ike most Burmese field commanders, Shwe Mann utilized forced civilian porters, including women and children, on a massive scale during operations against Karen insurgents.”

It has also been alleged that Shwe Mann was directly involved in the Depayin massacre, which saw the death of at least 70 people associated to the National League for Democracy (NLD). According to some sources, Gen Than Shwe ordered lower-ranking officers to carry out the attack on Aung San Suu Kyi’s convoy at Tabayin, March 2003. Than Shwe bypassed his deputy Maung Aye and Prime Minister Khin Nyunt, leaving Shwe Mann directly responsible for the military preparation of the attack.

He was also allegedly involved in repression of Saffron Revolution. According to another 2007 U.S. diplomatic cable, “by all accounts he willingly participated in the brutal repression of September’s pro-democracy protests.”

Political career

He was elected Speaker of the Lower House at the first regular session of the House of Representatives in 2011. From 1 July 2013 to 29 January 2016 he became Speaker of the Assembly of the Union.

In August 2015, amidst reports of tensions between himself and Thein Sein, Shwe Mann was removed from his post as Chairman of the Union Solidarity and Development Party and replaced by Htay Oo. But he contested in 2015 General Election as a candidate representing USDP in Phyu Township constituency. He was appointed in February 2015 as head of the Commission for the Assessment of Legal Affairs and Special Issues''.

Reform process
Shwe Mann has claimed that “reforms are irreversible” and their goal is “to build a multi-party democratic system and a market economy.” He has been called “a defender of the president [Thein Sein]’s reforms.” Although political reforms have moved apace, he also believes that socio-economic development and administrative reforms are lagging behind.

He has been seen as a staunch critic of corrupt practices amongst public officials. He had reportedly ordered action against corrupt authorities as far back as 2005. He criticised the government’s lack of transparency and accountability over public funds. He has firmly supported liberal reforms and the turn towards a market economy in Myanmar. He has been critical of Thein Sein’s “sluggish” approach to liberalisation, and has taken a strong stance against corrupt practices in the interest of “good governance.”

In regards to the 25 per cent of parliamentary seats allocated to the Tatmadaw, he has expressed hope that the Constitution will change before the elections to accommodate a more representative political outcome.

Democracy
Shwe Mann has argued that democracy must be seen “as a vehicle for progress.” In an interview, he stated that “the biggest challenge is changing the [old] mind-set and attitude. If people do not understand the essence of democracy, there will be more disadvantages than advantages.”

He has been praised for reaching out to political activist groups, including the 88 Generation Students Group.  He has often remarked on the importance of upholding the 2008 Constitution.

Relationship with opposition leader Aung San Suu Kyi
Despite their opposite political standpoints, the relationship between Shwe Mann and Aung San Suu Kyi has been defined as “excellent.” Others have defined it as “a working relationship, albeit perhaps one of convenience.” They have maintained an open stance on a possible future alliance.

Ethnic politics
He has referred to the Muslim Bengali minority as a sensitive issue that requires immediate attention. However, he has also stressed that the problem has been on-going for at least the last 100 years. In his conference at the Carnegie Endowment for International Peace, he pointed out that the ongoing violence in Rakhine State is not only between religious groups, but also between mobs.

Shwe Mann has assumed a liberal-conservative position on federalism. He has claimed he would rather see an evolution of the federal system rather than its revolution.

Education
Shwe Mann has spoken about the need to strengthen the current education system in Myanmar. He has argued that Myanmar education is “not in line with what [is] need today.” He has also spoken in favour of a National Educational Bill to improve basic and secondary education, including universities and vocational schools.

Stance on the international community
Shwe Mann has made it known that the country’s future development depends on the “economic cooperation [between] the private sector and the international community.” Speaking at The Asian Foundation, he praised the non-profit sector and NGOs, who work “not for an individual country but for the international community.”

Relationship with the U.S.
Shwe Mann has been seen as a key figure in the ongoing diplomatic effort to recalibrating Washington’s foreign policy towards Asia, known as "pivot." Indeed, the U.S. President sought his company during his first official visit to Myanmar.

Jim Della-Giacoma, Southeast Asia analyst for the International Crisis Group (ICG), argued that the U.S. had made a common cause with Shwe Mann to "bringing the national parliament to life as a legitimate democratic institution."

Oppositely, a U.S. State Department cable published by WikiLeaks in March 2007 was titled "Shwe Mann, Burma's Dictator-in-Waiting," and described him as an ambitious politician.

Shwe Mann has argued in favour of increased U.S. investment and technical support in Myanmar.

Relationship with China
Shwe Mann visited China before his 2015 official visit to the U.S. He has stressed that Myanmar and China are good neighbours and entertain friendly diplomatic relations. At the same time, he has called for greater transparency and accountability on Chinese investments.

ASEAN
Shwe Mann has emphasised the need to integrate Myanmar into the global economy. "In the globalised economy, no country or region can stand alone. The development of one region depends on integration with other regions in the world," he stated in an official press release.

He has therefore praised the potential of the ASEAN Economic Community as an “asset” to the economies of ASEAN nations and as a dialogue partner for the rest of the world.

India and North Korea
Whilst still in the military, Shwe Mann travelled to India and North Korea to sign military cooperation agreements with the two countries.

In the 2000s, he tried to forge closer ties with India, which he visited to appeal for more armaments in 2006. In November 2008, Shwe Mann travelled to North Korea and signed a memorandum of understanding on military cooperation. In an interview, he said that the Burmese counterpart "studied their air defence system, weapons factories, aircrafts and ships."

Personal life
Shwe Mann, a Burmese Buddhist, was born on 11 July 1947 in Kanyuntkwin, Bago Division, to father Pho Phay, and mother Htay Yi. He is married to Khin Lay Thet, a former high school teacher. In a 2007-dated U.S. cable, she was recorded as a member of the Panel of Patrons and one of four vice presidents of the Myanmar Women’s Affairs Federation. They have two sons, Toe Naing Mann and Aung Thet Mann.

He was placed in the U.S. and EU sanction lists (Embassy Rangoon 2007; Martin 2012). He was removed from the U.S. sanction list in September 2012 because, in the words of Under Secretary David S. Cohen, he has "taken concrete steps to promote political reforms and human rights, and to move Burma away from repression and dictatorship toward democracy and freedom".

Business ties (and corruption allegations)
It has been alleged that his sons have used their father’s political clout to advance their business interests.

Aung Thet Mann

Aung Thet Mann is the Chief Executive officer at Ayer Shwe Wah, which became the first private company allowed to export rice to Bangladesh and Singapore in 2005. The company is part of Burmese tycoon Tay Za’s Htoo Group of Companies.

When Shwe Mann was Regional Commander in the Ayeyarwady Division, Ayer Shwe Wah received lucrative government contracts to supply fertilizers to farmers throughout the delta. The company also received 30,000 acres of land for development under the government’s Lowland Development Program. These have since been returned with all dues and taxes paid for.

Ayer Shwe Wah has also been involved in construction projects in Naypyidaw.

Toe Naing Mann

Toe Naing Mann is the founder of Red Link Communications, a major Burmese telecommunications group. In 2004, Toe Naing Mann married Zay Zin Latt, daughter of Khin Shwe, who is the president of Zaygabar Co. Ltd. and a leading Rangoon real estate mogul. Among its businesses, Zaygabar operates the Karaweik Restaurant, a structure on Kandawgyi Lake, and handles Kandawgyi People Park’s operations.

In October 2007, the U.S. Treasury placed Khin Shwe and Zaygabar on its list of individuals and business targeted for sanctions.

References

1947 births
Burmese generals
Burmese military personnel
Defence Services Academy alumni
Living people
Members of Pyithu Hluttaw
Speakers of the House of Representatives of Myanmar
Union Solidarity and Development Party politicians
People from Bago Region
Burmese Buddhists